Rustica dulcis is a moth of the family Erebidae first described by Michael Fibiger in 2008. It is known from the mountains of Sikkim in northern India.

The wingspan is about 13 mm. The forewing is long, narrow, light brownish and the reniform stigma is weakly marked. The costal patch in the upper medial area is well marked and blackish. The subterminal line is marked and blackish. The terminal line on the hindwing is weakly defined.

References

Micronoctuini
Moths described in 2008
Taxa named by Michael Fibiger